Joseph Castro may refer to:

Joseph H. De Castro (1844–1892), Medal of Honor recipient in the US Civil War
Joe Castro (1927–2009), American jazz pianist
Joseph I. Castro, former California State University chancellor
Joseph Antequera y Castro, Panamanian lawyer and judge in Peru; insurrection leader